|}

The British Champions Fillies & Mares Stakes is a Group 1 flat horse race in Great Britain open to fillies and mares aged three years or older. It is run over a distance of 1 mile 3  furlongs and 211 yards (2,406 metres) as part of British Champions Day at Ascot in October.

History
The event was established in 1946 and was originally called the Princess Royal Stakes. It was named after the Princess Royal at that time, Princess Mary. For a period it took place in September, and it later moved to October.

The current system of race grading was introduced in 1971, and the Princess Royal Stakes subsequently held Group 3 status.

The race was run at Newmarket in 2000, after being called off at Ascot due to a security alert. It was switched to Ascot's late September fixture in 2004. It took place at Newmarket again in 2005, as its usual home was closed for redevelopment. It reverted to October in 2007.

The event was promoted to Group 2 level, transferred to Newmarket and renamed the Pride Stakes in 2008. It was named after Pride, a recent winner of the Champion Stakes. From this point it was staged during the venue's Champions' Meeting in mid-October. The title "Princess Royal Stakes" was assigned to a different race at Ascot, an event previously called the Harvest Stakes. The Pride Stakes had a purse of £100,000 in 2010.

The race returned to Ascot and was given its present name in 2011. Its prize fund was now £250,000. Part of the newly created British Champions Day, it became the final race in the fillies & mares division of the British Champions Series.

The British Champions Fillies & Mares Stakes was upgraded to Group 1 in 2013. Its total prize money was doubled to £500,000. The title Pride Stakes was given to a Listed race at Newmarket formerly known as the Severals Stakes.

Records

Most successful horse (2 wins):
 Shebeen – 1974, 1975
 Crystal Capella – 2008, 2010

Leading jockey (8 wins):
 Lester Piggott – Rose of Medina (1959), Green Opal (1960), Vhairi (1963), Bracey Bridge (1965), Bamboozle (1967), Mandera (1973), Karamita (1980), One Way Street (1984)

Leading trainer (9 wins):
 John Dunlop – Predicament (1966), Trillionaire (1978), Flighting (1981), Believer (1982), Banket (1988), Labibeh (1995), Signorina Cattiva (1999), Head in the Clouds (2001), Acts of Grace (2006)

Leading owner (4 wins):
 HH Aga Khan IV – Karamita (1980), Tashtiya (1986), Narwala (1990), Ashalanda (2009)

Winners since 1979

Earlier winners

 1946: Mehmany
 1947: Mombasa
 1948: Angelola
 1949: Jet Plane
 1950: Divinalh
 1951: Verse
 1952: Nicky Nook
 1953: Skye
 1954: Dust Storm
 1955: Nemora
 1956: Carezza
 1957: Nagaika
 1958: Mother Goose
 1959: Rose of Medina
 1960: Green Opal
 1961: Tenacity
 1962: Romantica
 1963: Vhairi
 1964: French Possession
 1965: Bracey Bridge
 1966: Predicament
 1967: Bamboozle
 1968: no race
 1969: Seventh Bride
 1970: Heavenly Thought
 1971: Hill Circus
 1972: Attica Meli
 1973: Mandera
 1974: Shebeen
 1975: Shebeen
 1976: no race
 1977: Aloft
 1978: Trillionaire

See also
 Horseracing in Great Britain
 List of British flat horse races
 Recurring sporting events established in 1946 – this race is included under its original title, Princess Royal Stakes.

References

 Paris-Turf: 

 Racing Post:

 galopp-sieger.de – Pride Stakes (ex Princess Royal Stakes).
 horseracingintfed.com – International Federation of Horseracing Authorities – British Champions Fillies & Mares Stakes (2018).
 pedigreequery.com – Princess Royal Stakes – Ascot.
 

Long-distance horse races for fillies and mares
Ascot Racecourse
Flat races in Great Britain
British Champions Series
1946 establishments in England